Santiago Ocampos Ibarra (born 22 January 2002) is a Paraguayan professional footballer who plays as a defender for Campeonato Brasileiro Série A club Flamengo. Besides Paraguay, he has played in Brazil, Italy, and Israel.

Career

Juventus
At the age of 16, Ocampos joined the youth academy of Juventus, Italy's most successful club.

Beitar Jerusalem
In 2020, Ocampos signed for Beitar Jerusalem in Israel after receiving offers from Brazil, Mexico, the United States and almost joining a Portuguese side.

Flamengo
On 29 December 2021, after leaving Beitar Jerusalem, Ocampos signed with Flamengo a two year deal until December 2023.

References

External links
 
 

2002 births
Living people
Paraguayan footballers
Association football defenders
Beitar Jerusalem F.C. players
CR Flamengo footballers
Israeli Premier League players
Campeonato Brasileiro Série A players
Paraguayan expatriate footballers
Expatriate footballers in Italy
Expatriate footballers in Israel
Expatriate footballers in Brazil
Paraguayan expatriate sportspeople in Italy
Paraguayan expatriate sportspeople in Israel
Paraguayan expatriate sportspeople in Brazil